Emmy Gunilla Alasalmi (born 17 January 1994) is a Swedish ice hockey defenseman and member of the Swedish national team, currently serving as an alternate captain for AIK Hockey Dam in the Swedish Women's Hockey League (SDHL). She holds the record for most games played in an AIK uniform and is seventh all-time among all SDHL players.

Career 
Alsalmi grew in Viggbyholm, where she played as a youth for Viggbyholms IK. In 2009, she joined AIK and made her Riksserien debut, scoring 7 points in 27 games in her rookie season.

On the 15th of February 2015, she scored the winning goal in the longest shootout in SDHL history, a 56-shot shootout round against Brynäs IF.

International 
She represented Sweden at the 2015 IIHF Women's World Championship and in the women's ice hockey tournament at the 2018 Winter Olympics. Named to the Swedish roster for the 2022 Winter Olympics, she had to be replaced at the last minute after testing positive for COVID-19.

Personal life 
Alsalmi has studied at the Swedish School of Sport and Health Sciences.

References

External links 

1994 births
Living people
Swedish women's ice hockey defencemen
Olympic ice hockey players of Sweden
Ice hockey players at the 2018 Winter Olympics
Ice hockey people from Stockholm
Ice hockey players at the 2012 Winter Youth Olympics
Youth Olympic gold medalists for Sweden
Swedish School of Sport and Health Sciences alumni